Woodford  may refer to:

Places

Australia
Woodford, New South Wales
Woodford, Queensland, a town in the Moreton Bay Region
Woodford, Victoria

Canada
Woodford, Ontario

England
Woodford, Cornwall
Woodford, Gloucestershire
Woodford, Greater Manchester
Woodford, Northamptonshire
Woodford, Somerset
Woodford, Wiltshire
Woodford cum Membris, Northamptonshire
Woodford Halse, Northamptonshire

London, England
Woodford, London, a suburb of London. It includes the districts:
South Woodford 
Woodford Bridge
Woodford Green
Woodford Wells
It is served by 
Woodford tube station and 
South Woodford tube station

Ireland
Woodford, County Galway
Woodford River, a tributary of the River Shannon

United States
 Woodford, California, Kern County
 Woodford, former name of Woodfords, California, Alpine County
 Woodford, Illinois
 Woodford, Oklahoma
 Woodford, South Carolina
 Woodford, Wisconsin
 Woodford, Vermont
 Woodford, Virginia
 Woodford (Simons Corner, Virginia), listed on the NRHP in Virginia
 Woodford (mansion), Philadelphia
 Woodford County, Illinois
 Woodford County, Kentucky

People
Woodford (surname)

Football clubs
Woodford Town F.C. (1937)
Woodford Town F.C. (2007)
Woodford Wells F.C.
Woodford United F.C.

See also
Woodfords, California, United States
Woodford County High School (Kentucky)
Woodford County High School (London)
Woodford Lodge High School, Cheshire, England
Woodford Court, Shepherds Bush, London
Woodford Folk Festival, Queensland, Australia
Woodford Hill River, Dominica
Woodford Island, Australia
Woodford Patient Capital Trust, British investment trust
Woodford Reserve, a brand of bourbon whiskey
Woodford Stakes, horse race, Kentucky
Miss Woodford, Thoroughbred racemare
Woodforde, South Australia, suburb of Adelaide